Tracz is a surname which means "sawyer" in Polish. Notable people with the surname include:

 Ala Tracz (born 2010), Polish singer
 Chris Tracz, American college baseball coach
 Jerzy Tracz (born 1943), Polish swimmer
 Józef Tracz (born 1964), Polish wrestler
 Małgorzata Tracz (born 1985), Polish politician
 Mieczysław Tracz (1962–2019), Polish wrestler
 Szymon Tracz (born 1998), Polish road cyclist

See also
 

Polish-language surnames